A grant table is an interface which grants access to memory pages to Virtual Machines that do not own the pages.  Grant tables are implemented on Xen hypervisor.

Applications
Grant tables are generally used in inter-virtual machine communication, when one of the communicating VM's requires pages owned by the other VM.

References

Interfaces
Virtual machines